Oreocome is a genus of flowering plants belonging to the family Apiaceae.

Its native range is Afghanistan to Southern Central China.

Species:

Oreocome aegopodioides 
Oreocome arguta 
Oreocome depauperata 
Oreocome duriuscula 
Oreocome hindukushensis 
Oreocome involucellata 
Oreocome limprichtii 
Oreocome nuristanica

References

Apioideae